Septoria pistaciae is a fungal plant pathogen infecting pistachios.

References

External links
 Index Fungorum
 USDA ARS Fungal Database

pistaciae
Fungal tree pathogens and diseases
Fruit tree diseases
Fungi described in 1842
Taxa named by John Baptiste Henri Joseph Desmazières